is an action-adventure hack-and-slash video game developed by Gaijin Entertainment and published by Konami and Iceberg Interactive for Microsoft Windows, PlayStation 3, Xbox 360 and Mac OS X.  The game is a reboot/sequel to Gaijin Entertainment's past work, X-Blades. Blades of Time was released in North America on March 6, 2012, in Japan and Australia on March 8, 2012, and in Europe on March 16, 2012. The Windows and OS X versions were announced at a later date, originally for April 18, before the release date was pushed back to April 20, 2012. A Nintendo Switch version was released in Europe and North America on May 14, 2019. In the English version, the lead character is voiced by Miranda Raison.

Gameplay
Blades of Time  features an ability called "Time Rewind", which lets the player turn back time and produces a clone that replicates the last actions the protagonist Ayumi made and is vital in solving puzzles and fighting hordes of enemies. The game also features a "Dash" ability which can instantly close the distance between Ayumi and her enemies, as well as travel quickly using environmental features. As the game progresses, Ayumi can unlock more than 40 sets of skills, including attacks and combos, as well as the powerful Order and Chaos forms of magic. The game also offers both a co-op campaign and PvP features.

Plot
A dual sword-wielding treasure hunter named  finds herself stuck on a mysterious and dangerous island. While rich with bounty, the island is also caught in the throes of Chaos magic. Ayumi soon discovers that it is also the home of thousands of long-held secrets, including special powers and abilities that she can gain for herself. Using everything she can, she must find a way to defeat armies of menacing villains and a multitude of treacherous traps in order to break free of the possessed island's grasp.

Reception

The game received "mixed" reviews on Microsoft Windows, PlayStation 3 and Xbox 360, but received "generally unfavorable" reviews on the Nintendo Switch, according to the review aggregation website Metacritic.  In Japan, Famitsu gave the PS3 and Xbox 360 versions a score of all four eights for a total of 32 out of 40.

Blades of Time for Nintendo Switch took 3rd place in the list of 15 Worst Reviewed Games of 2019 according to IGN.

References

External links
 
 

2012 video games
Action-adventure games
Fantasy video games
Hack and slash games
Konami games
Multiplayer and single-player video games
MacOS games
PlayStation 3 games
Video games about time travel
Video game reboots
Video game sequels
Video games developed in Russia
Video games featuring female protagonists
Windows games
Xbox 360 games
Nintendo Switch games
Iceberg Interactive games
Gaijin Entertainment games